Mshindo Msolla is a Tanzanian professional football manager. Until 2002 he coached the club Taifa Stars. From October 2002 to July 2003 he led the Tanzania national football team. Then he again coached the club Taifa Stars.

References

Year of birth missing (living people)
Living people
Tanzanian football managers
Tanzania national football team managers
Place of birth missing (living people)